Abdulla Saleh Aman (born 1970) is a Bahraini international footballer who plays for Busaiteen and Bahrain national football team.

International goals 
Scores and results list Bahrain's goal tally first.

References 

Living people
1970 births
Bahraini footballers
Bahrain international footballers
Association football midfielders